Duke of Viseu (in Portuguese Duque de Viseu) was a Portuguese Royal Dukedom created in 1415 by King John I of Portugal for his third male child, Henry the Navigator, following the conquest of Ceuta. 

When Henry the Navigator died without issue, his nephew, Infante Ferdinand of Portugal (King Edward, King of Portugal's younger son), who was already Duke of Beja, inherited the Dukedom of Viseu and, when his younger son became King of Portugal as Manuel I, this became a royal Dukedom.

List of the Dukes of Viseu
Infante Henrique, Duke of Viseu (1394–1460), King João I's fourth son (third surviving);
Infante Fernando, Duke of Viseu (1433–1470), also 1st Duke of Beja, King Duarte I's third son (second surviving);
Infante João, Duke of Viseu (1448–1472), also 2nd Duke of Beja, Infante Fernando's eldest son;
Infante Diogo, Duke of Viseu (1450–1484), also 3rd Duke de Beja, Infante Fernando's second son;
King Manuel I (1469–1521), Infante Fernando's seventh son (third surviving);
Infanta Maria, Duchess of Viseu (1521–1577), King Manuel I's daughter from his third marriage;

Claimants 
Following the establishment of the Portuguese Republic, the following individuals have claimed to be the Dukes of Viseu:
Prince Miguel, Duke of Viseu (1878–1923), Prince Miguel, Duke of Braganza's elder son from his first marriage;
Infante Miguel, Duke of Viseu (born 1946), Prince Duarte Nuno, Duke of Braganza's second son.

See also
List of Portuguese Dukedoms

Bibliography
”Nobreza de Portugal e do Brasil" – Vol. I, pages 272/295; Vol. III, pages 544/546. Published by Zairol Lda., Lisbon 1989. 

 
Dukedoms of Portugal
Viseu
1415 establishments in Portugal